Neilsen is a less common spelling of the surnames Nielsen or Neilson.

Neilsen may refer to:

People with the name Neilsen
 Hans Peter Mareus Neilsen Gammel (1854-1931), a Danish-American author and publisher of books covering legislation in the state of Texas
 Lorri Neilsen Glenn, Canadian contemporary poet, ethnographer, and essayist
 Jade Neilsen (b. 1991), Australian competition swimmer
 Philip Neilsen (b. 1949), Australian contemporary poet and fiction writer
Shirley Neilsen Blum (b. 1932), American art historian, author, gallerist, and professor.

See also
Neilson (disambiguation)
Nielsen (disambiguation)
Nielson, surname
Nilsen, surname

Patronymic surnames